Jörg Frischmann is a Paralympic athlete from Germany. He is classified F43, and competes mainly in shot put and javelin events.

Biography
Joerg has competed in the Paralympics on four occasions. His first was in Barcelona in 1992, where he won gold in the shot put and silver in the javelin.  His next appearance was in 1996 where he won silver in the shot put. He also competed in the pentathlon and javelin.  In 2000 he reverted to competing in the javelin and shot put, winning bronze medals in both events.  His final appearance was in the 2004 Summer Paralympics where he only competed in the shot put and was unable to finish among the medals.

His 14.21 m shot put throw at the Atlanta Paralympics still stands as the T43 world record today.

After studying sport sciences at the German Sport University in Cologne, Frischmann has been working as the Director of Sport for Persons with a Disability at TSV Bayer 04 Leverkusen since 1998.

References 

Paralympic athletes of Germany
Athletes (track and field) at the 1992 Summer Paralympics
Athletes (track and field) at the 1996 Summer Paralympics
Athletes (track and field) at the 2000 Summer Paralympics
Athletes (track and field) at the 2004 Summer Paralympics
Paralympic gold medalists for Germany
Paralympic silver medalists for Germany
Paralympic bronze medalists for Germany
Living people
World record holders in Paralympic athletics
Medalists at the 1992 Summer Paralympics
Medalists at the 1996 Summer Paralympics
Medalists at the 2000 Summer Paralympics
Year of birth missing (living people)
Paralympic medalists in athletics (track and field)
German male javelin throwers
German male shot putters
Javelin throwers with limb difference
Shot putters with limb difference
Paralympic javelin throwers
Paralympic shot putters